Pirogues River is a major river of southwestern New Caledonia. It flows into the sea at Pirogues Bay. It is noted for its ophiolite reserves.

References

Rivers of New Caledonia